Pressure Drop may refer to:

"Pressure Drop" (song), by Toots & the Maytals, covered by many others
Pressure Drop (album), a 1975 album by Robert Palmer
Pressure Drop, a 2010 album by Billy Bragg
DSSV Pressure Drop, the mother ship for the submersible Limiting Factor

See also
Pressure drop, in pressure measurement